Curzoner Kalom (The Pen of Curzon) is a Bengali thriller drama film directed by Souvik Mitra and produced by Pawan Kanodia. The film was released on 3 November 2017 under the banner of AVA Film Productions.

Plot
Lord Curzon gifted his historical pen to a Bengali zaminder in 1905. It is a valuable thing with 10 carat diamond. Curzon signed for the Partition of Bengal in 1905 by this pen which was lost latter from the zaminder family. Papu, an amateur detective and her boyfriend Tutu decide to find the pen from a hidden place before the Durga puja. But few others people are also trying to capture the pen.

Cast
 Paran Banerjee as Jota Mama
 Kharaj Mukherjee as Monohar
 Kushal Chakraborty as Shoumya
 Lily Chakravarty as Ranga Pishi
 Saheb Bhattacharya as Tutu
 Kanchan Mullick as Gunodhar
 Pushpita Mukherjee as Soumi
 Debdut Ghosh as Shubho
 Adrija Ghosh as Beni
 Poulomi Das as Papu
 Mallika Ghosh as Mili
 Sumit Samaddar as Gobu

References

External links
 

2017 films
2010s Bengali-language films
Indian thriller drama films
2017 thriller drama films